Adult Contemporary is a chart published by Billboard ranking the top-performing songs in the United States in the adult contemporary music (AC) market.  In 1966, 18 songs topped the chart, then published under the title Easy Listening, based on playlists submitted by easy listening radio stations and sales reports submitted by stores.

In the first issue of Billboard of the year, Roger Miller moved up one place to number one with "England Swings", however he held the top spot for only a single week before being replaced at number one by Al Martino's "Spanish Eyes", which spent four weeks atop the chart.  Immediately after Martino's run at number one, Frank Sinatra, one of the most popular and influential musical artists of the 20th century, gained his first Easy Listening chart-topper with "It Was a Very Good Year".  Sinatra, who was experiencing a career resurgence at the age of 50, achieved several chart distinctions in 1966.  He had the most number ones, topping the chart with four singles, spent the most total weeks in the top spot with 13, and had the longest unbroken run at number one when "Strangers in the Night" spent seven consecutive weeks topping the listing.  Although Sinatra reportedly did not care for "Strangers in the Night", it also topped Billboards all-genres chart, the Hot 100.

Two other Easy Listening number ones also topped the Hot 100.  In the early part of the year, serving soldier Staff Sgt. Barry Sadler reached the top of both listings with "The Ballad of the Green Berets".  The patriotic song went on to be the biggest-selling single of the year in the U.S.  In December, British novelty act The New Vaudeville Band reached number one on both charts with the 1920s-styled "Winchester Cathedral", the only significant hit of the group's career.  "Winchester Cathedral" was the penultimate Easy Listening chart-topper of 1966, being replaced in the top spot in Billboards final issue of the year by Sinatra's "That's Life".

Chart history

References

See also
1966 in music
List of artists who reached number one on the U.S. Adult Contemporary chart

1966
1966 record charts